South Brisbane may refer to:

 South Brisbane, Queensland, a suburb in Brisbane, Australia
 South Brisbane Cemetery, a cemetery in Brisbane
 South Brisbane Dry Dock, a dry dock in Brisbane
 South Brisbane Library, a heritage-listed former library in South Brisbane
 South Brisbane Football Club, football club in Brisbane
 South Brisbane railway station, a railway station in South Brisbane
 South Brisbane Reach of the Brisbane River
 South Brisbane Town Hall, a former town hall
 City of South Brisbane, a former local government area in Queensland
 Electoral district of South Brisbane, an electoral district of the Queensland Legislative Assembly
 Electoral district of Town of South Brisbane, a former electoral district of the Queensland Legislative Assembly